Michael Bartlett (born 25 December 1978 in Christchurch, New Zealand) is a former rugby union player who played for Glasgow Warriors on the wing.

Bartlett was Scottish-qualified as his maternal grandmother was born in Scotland. He signed for Glasgow Warriors in 2000, one week after arriving in Glasgow.

He previously played for Canterbury and was in their training academy.

He was named in a New Zealand 'back up squad' in 2000 outside the 30 man strong All Black World Cup Squad.

He was included in the 2002 Scotland squad that played Barbarians on 1 June.

References

External links
 Pro 12 Profile
 Statbunker profile

Living people
1978 births
Glasgow Warriors players
Rugby union players from Christchurch
Expatriate rugby union players in Scotland
New Zealand expatriate sportspeople in Scotland